George David (born 1942) is the former head of United Technologies Corporation. 

George David may also refer to:
 George A. David (born 1937) Greek Cypriot Coca-Cola executive

See also
 David George (disambiguation)
 George Davis (disambiguation)